The 1960 United States presidential election in New York took place on November 8, 1960. All 50 states were part of the 1960 United States presidential election. Voters chose 45 electors to the Electoral College, which selected the president and vice president. New York was won by Democratic Senator John F. Kennedy of Massachusetts, who was running against incumbent Republican Vice President Richard Nixon. Kennedy was running with Texas Senator, and his strongest opponent in the 1960 Democratic Party presidential primaries, Lyndon B. Johnson for vice president, and Nixon ran with internationally popular United States Ambassador to the United Nations Henry Cabot Lodge, Jr.

Kennedy won New York with 52.53% of the vote to Nixon's 47.27%, a victory margin of 5.26%. New York weighed in for this election as 5% more Democratic than the national average. The presidential election of 1960 was a very partisan election for New York, with 99.8% of the electorate voting for either the Democratic or the Republican Parties. In typical form for the time, the highly populated centers of New York City, Buffalo, and Albany, voted primarily Democratic, while the suburban areas such as Nassau and Westchester and the rural counties in New York turned out for Nixon as the Republican candidate.

Kennedy won the election in New York by a solid 5-point margin, representing a dramatic shift toward the Democratic Party in the state: just four years earlier, Dwight Eisenhower had carried New York State for the Republicans with over 60% of the vote. The results of this election in New York are typical of the nationwide trend of the urbanization of the Democratic Party, and Kennedy's dominance in heavily populated New York City was a vital component to his victory in the state. Kennedy took 62.62% of the overall vote in New York City, to Nixon's 37.04%, and carried four out of five boroughs. Kennedy's victory in Queens, in the midst of a virtual tie nationwide, marked a dramatic turning point for the heavily populated borough's political leanings. Prior to 1960, Queens had largely been a Republican borough, and since World War I had only voted Democratic between 1928-1936. Beginning in 1960, Queens became a reliably Democratic borough, and since then has gone Republican only once, in the 1972 Republican landslide.

Nixon for his part ran on a platform of continuing the "peace and prosperity" felt throughout the United States under President Eisenhower, which gained him popularity in the developing regions of the West and Pacific States, while Kennedy attained his popularity in urban regions, in part, due to his progressive stand on international politics. This included taking a stronger stance with the Soviet Union, which was a very important issue to many city-dwellers, fearing annihilation during the height of the post-nuclear age.

The electors of New York were vital to Kennedy's overall victory, as he defeated Nixon 303–219 in the United States Electoral College. Had Nixon carried New York, then all other things being equal he would have won pluralities in both the popular and electoral vote. However, the Republican nominee would have still finished two votes short of an overall majority in the Electoral College, as he would have had a total of 265 of the 267 pledged electors needed to win compared to 258 for Kennedy. The 14 unpledged electors of Mississippi and Alabama would have held the balance of power in the Electoral College (unable to influence the overall result, these electors opted to cast their votes in favor of Virginia Senator Harry F. Byrd).

1960 was the last US presidential election in which New York State had the highest population of any state in the United States. In November 1962, the state of California would overtake New York as the most populous state in the nation, thus ending New York's tenure of being the most populous state after 152 years. Decades later, New York State was also overtaken in the population totals by Texas in May 1994, and by Florida in July 2014, thus pushing New York down into the fourth most populous state in the nation today.

Results

Results by county

See also
 United States presidential elections in New York
 Civil Rights Movement
 Conservative Coalition
 Cuban Missile Crisis
 Presidency of John F. Kennedy
 Presidency of Lyndon B. Johnson
 The Cold War

References

New York
1960
1960 New York (state) elections